Geering may refer to -

In fiction
Captain Hans Geering, in the television series Allo Allo!

People
John Geering (1941-99), British cartoonist
Lloyd Geering (b 1918), New Zealand theologian

Transport
Geering (automobile), a British marque manufactured 1899–1904.